Saffron terror, or Hindutva terror, is a term used to describe acts of violence motivated by Hindutva. Hindu extremism is usually perpetrated by members, or alleged members, of Hindu nationalist organisations like Rashtriya Swayamsevak Sangh (RSS) or Abhinav Bharat. The term comes from the symbolic use of the saffron colour by many Hindu nationalist organisations.

Terminology 

The term "saffron terror" was used as early as 2002. It gained popularity in the aftermath of the 2007–2008 attacks which targeted Pakistanis and Muslims and were allegedly instigated by members or alleged members of Hindu nationalist organisations like Rashtriya Swayamsevak Sangh (RSS) and Abhinav Bharat.

The saffron colour appears in the party flags of various national parties of India like the Indian National Congress (Congress) and the Bharatiya Janata Party (BJP). A saffron-coloured flag is commonly seen in most temples in India. Buddhist monks typically wear saffron robes as a symbol of wisdom. It has been claimed that the term "saffron terrorism" is a misnomer considering the historical descriptions of the saffron colour compared to the definitions of terrorism.

Controversies 
According to the journalist and BJP leader Balbir Punj, the term "saffron terror" was invented and used by the Congress party in the aftermath of the 2007–2008 incidents (see below) in order to denounce the party's political opposition as "terrorists". In an analysis of the security situation during this period, B. Raman referred to acts of alleged reprisal terrorism by Hindus, criticizing "politicisation and communalisation of the investigative process" as leading to a "paralysis of the investigation machinery." Kanchan Gupta and Swapan Dasgupta have said that investigators were using the term "saffron terror" in their statements to the media to promote the agenda of the Congress.

In 2008, Rajnath Singh, the then president of the Bharatiya Janata Party's (BJP), spoke of a "political conspiracy" aimed at the "vilification of Hindu saints and army officers in the name of Hindu terrorism". The term "saffron terror" was prominently used by some Congress party members in this campaign, most prominently by Digvijaya Singh. The BJP criticised these statements and filed a complaint with the Election Commission of India, citing it as a violation of the Model Code of Conduct for political parties. The Election Commission issued a show-cause notice to Digvijay Singh on this complaint.

Former Home Minister of India P. Chidambaram urged Indians to beware of "Saffron terror" in August 2010 at a meeting of state police chiefs in New Delhi. Since making that remark, a Hindu swami in the Patan district has filed a defamation lawsuit against Chidambaram, saying that the saffron colour is a symbol of Hindu religion and that saints across the country wear attire of the same colour. The swami also said that saffron was a symbol of peace, sacrifice and God, and that Chidambaram has hurt the sentiments of Hindus by linking the symbol with terrorism. On 6 September 2010, a Gujarat court ordered a probe into the use of the term by Chidambaram. Chidambaram was also criticised by members of his own party (the Indian National Congress) for the use of the term, with Congress spokesman Janardhan Dwivedi claiming "terrorism does not have any colour other than black."

In the 2018 book Hindu Terror:  Insider Account of Ministry of Home Affairs, R.V.S. Mani, a former officer in the Home Ministry, alleged that the United Progressive Alliance (UPA) government had forced Home Ministry officials to manufacture a narrative about the presence of "Hindu terror".

Incidents

2007 Samjhauta Express bombings 

Twin blasts shook two coaches of the Samjhauta Express around midnight on 18 February 2007. Sixty-eight people were killed in the ensuing fire and dozens were injured. It was linked to Abhinav Bharat, a Hindu fundamentalist group. In November 2008, it was reported that the Maharashtra Anti-Terrorism Squad (ATS) suspected the attacks were linked to Prasad Shrikant Purohit, an Indian army officer and member of Abhinav Bharat. Purohit himself claimed that he had "infiltrated" the Abhinav Bharat. During an army's Court of Inquiry, 59 witnesses stated to the court, along with officers who testified that Purohit was tasked with gathering intelligence inputs by infiltrating extremist organisations. On 8 January 2011, Swami Aseemanand, a pracharak of the Rashtriya Swayamsevak Sangh (RSS), confessed that he was involved in the bombing of Samjhauta Express, a statement he later claimed to have made under duress.

There have also been allegations that Lashkar-e-Taiba was responsible for the bombings. The United States declared Arif Qasmani, a Pakistani national and alleged 'LeT financier', to be the chief coordinator of the 2006 train bombing in Mumbai as well as the 2007 Samjhauta Express bombings, and labelled him an international terrorist via the United Nations.

2007 Ajmer Dargah attack 

The Ajmer Dargah blast occurred on 11 October 2007, outside the Dargah (shrine) of Sufi saint Moinuddin Chishti in Ajmer, Rajasthan, allegedly by the Hindutva organisation Rashtriya Swayamsevak Sangh (RSS) and its groups. On 22 October 2010, five accused perpetrators, of which four said to belong to the RSS, were arrested in connection with the blast. Swami Aseemanand, in his confession, implicated the then General Secretary Mohan Bhagwat for ordering the terrorist strike. Bhavesh Patel, another accused in the bombings, has corroborated these statements but later claimed that the Home Minister Sushilkumar Shinde and some other Congress leaders forced him to implicate the RSS leaders.

2008 Malegaon blasts 

On 29 September 2008, three bombs exploded in the States of Gujarat and Maharashtra killing 8 persons and injuring 80. During the investigation in Maharashtra, a Hindu group was alleged to have been involved in the blasts. Three of the arrested persons were identified as Sadhvi Pragya Singh Thakur, Shiv Narayan Gopal Singh Kalsanghra and Shyam Bhawarlal Sahu. All three were produced before the Chief Judicial Magistrate's court in Nashik, which remanded them to custody till 3 November. On 28 October, the Shiv Sena, came out in support of the accused saying that the arrests were merely political in nature. Lending credence to this, the party chief, Uddhav Thackeray, pointed out a potential conflict of interest in political rivalry as the Nationalist Congress Party (NCP) controlled the relevant ministry. NIA, National Investigation Agency, has found no evidence against Sadhvi Pragya Singh Thakur and it has recommended the court to drop all charges against her. following which Bombay High Court granted bail to Pragya Thakur on 22 April 2017.

The Army officer Prasad Shrikant Purohit was also accused of being involved in the blast. His counsel alleged that he was being falsely framed for political reasons because he has intelligence data of a sensitive nature pertaining to the operations of Students Islamic Movement of India (SIMI) and Pakistan's Inter-Services Intelligence, which could embarrass some quarters.

Reportedly, the term "saffron terror" was used to describe this event in mainstream Indian media.

Other incidents 
Members of Abhinav Bharat have been alleged to have been involved in a plot to kill Rashtriya Swayamsevak Sangh President Mohan Bhagwat, Headlines Today released a recorded video tested by the Central Forensic Science Laboratory which indicated the uncovering of an alleged plot to assassinate the Vice President of India Hamid Ansari. Tehelka also released alleged audio tape transcripts of main conspirators of Abhinav Bharat, which indicated involvement of Military intelligence officers with the Abhinav Bharat group, in their January 2011 edition.

The Indian Home Secretary R. K. Singh said that at least 10 people having close links with the Rashtriya Swayamsevak Sangh (RSS) and its affiliated organisations were named accused in various acts of terror across India.

According to released documents by WikiLeaks, Congress(I) party's general secretary Rahul Gandhi remarked to US Ambassador Tim Roemer, at a luncheon hosted by Prime Minister of India at his residence in July 2009, that the RSS was a "bigger threat" to India than the Lashkar-e-Taiba. At The Annual Conference of Director Generals of Police held in New Delhi on 16 September 2011, a special director of the Intelligence Bureau (IB) reportedly informed the state police chiefs that Hindutva activists have either been suspected or are under investigation in 16 incidents of bomb blasts in the country.

See also 

 Communalism (South Asia)
 Nationalist terrorism
 Saffronisation

Notes

References

Further reading 
 
 

Political neologisms
Nationalist terrorism
Propaganda in India
Hinduism-motivated violence in India
Far-right politics in India
Religious terrorism
Hinduism-related controversies
Militant Hindu groups
Religious extremism